Saphanus is a genus of beetles belonging to the family Cerambycidae.

The species of this genus are found in Central Europe.

Species:

Saphanus kadleci 
Saphanus piceus

References

Cerambycidae
Cerambycidae genera